Zachary Dylan Grotz (born February 17, 1993) is an American professional baseball pitcher for the Acereros de Monclova of the Mexican League. He has played in Major League Baseball (MLB) for the Seattle Mariners.

Career
Grotz attended Burlingame High School in Burlingame, California. He attended Cal State Monterey Bay in 2012, playing college baseball for the Otters. Grotz transferred to the College of San Mateo for the 2013 season. He then transferred to the University of Tennessee and played for the Volunteers in 2014. Grotz transferred to Embry–Riddle Aeronautical University for the 2015 season.

2015–2018
Grotz was drafted by the Houston Astros in the 28th round, with the 829th overall selection, of the 2015 MLB draft. He split the 2015 season between the Rookie league Greeneville Astros and the Low-A Tri-City ValleyCats, registering a combined 5–3 record with a 3.27 earned run average (ERA). Grotz was released by the Astros organization on April 2, 2016.

On April 12, 2016, Grotz signed with the Washington Wild Things of the independent Frontier League. In 29 appearances with Washington, Grotz recorded a 4–2 record and 1.36 ERA with 51 strikeouts in 46.1 innings of work. On August 18, 2016, Grotz's contract was sold to the Los Angeles Dodgers organization. He pitched in five games for the rookie-level Ogden Raptors, posting a 4–0 record and 0.50 ERA, but was released on September 18.

On February 14, 2017, Grotz signed with the Bridgeport Bluefish of the independent Atlantic League of Professional Baseball. In 67 appearances for Bridgeport in 2017, Grotz logged a 4–3 record and 3.77 ERA with 80 strikeouts in 74 innings pitched. He became a free agent after the season.

On March 1, 2018, Grotz returned to the Atlantic League, signing with the York Revolution. In 7 games with York, Grotz registered a 2–1 record and 2.53 ERA with 33 strikeouts in 32 innings of work. On June 15, 2018, Grotz's contract was purchased by the New York Mets organization. He finished the season with the Single-A Columbia Fireflies, pitching to a 3–7 record and 4.61 ERA in 13 appearances. On November 2, he elected free agency.

Seattle Mariners
On February 21, 2019, Grotz signed a minor league contract with the Seattle Mariners organization. He opened the 2019 season with the Double-A Arkansas Travelers.  On July 31, the Mariners selected Grotz's contract and promoted him to the major leagues for the first time. He made his major league debut on August 2 against the Houston Astros, allowing one run over two innings pitched. During the 2019 season, Grotz appeared in 14 games with the Mariners, all in relief, pitching to a 0–1 record with 4.15 ERA and 18 strikeouts in  innings pitched. He also made two appearances in Triple-A with the Tacoma Rainiers of the Pacific Coast League.

During the shortened 2020 season, Grotz appeared in five games with the Mariners, with no decisions and a 14.73 ERA and four strikeouts in  innings pitched. On September 1, 2020, Grotz was outrighted off of the Mariners' 40-man roster. He did not play in a minor league game due to the cancellation of the minor league season because of the COVID-19 pandemic and became a free agent on November 2.

Boston Red Sox
On January 18, 2021, Grotz signed a minor league contract with the Boston Red Sox. He was assigned to the Triple-A Worcester Red Sox and spent time on the injured list until making his season debut on June 11. In eight appearances (one start) with Worcester, Grotz compiled a 9.58 ERA while striking out seven batters in  innings. He did not pitch after July 10, spending the rest of the season on the injured list. On November 7, he again elected free agency.

Acereros de Monclova
On May 27, 2022, Grotz signed with the Acereros de Monclova of the Mexican League.

References

External links

1993 births
Living people
People from San Mateo, California
Baseball players from California
Major League Baseball pitchers
Seattle Mariners players
Cal State Monterey Bay Otters baseball players
San Mateo Bulldogs baseball players
Tennessee Volunteers baseball players
Embry–Riddle Eagles baseball players
Greeneville Astros players
Tri-City ValleyCats players
Ogden Raptors players
Washington Wild Things players
Bridgeport Bluefish players
York Revolution players
Columbia Fireflies players
Arkansas Travelers players
Tacoma Rainiers players
Worcester Red Sox players